Affairs of Geraldine is a 1946 American comedy film directed by George Blair and written by John K. Butler. The film stars Jane Withers, Jimmy Lydon, Raymond Walburn, Donald Meek, Charles Quigley and Grant Withers. The film was released on November 18, 1946, by Republic Pictures.

Plot

After Mrs. Cooper dies, her very valuable estate is left to her children.  Her sons Henry and Wayne are privy to a private recording in which Mrs. Cooper expresses her last wishes that the boys help find a suitable husband for their tomboy sister, Geraldine.  At the time Geraldine is only interested in the Cooperville's town fire truck.  Henry and Wayne, somewhat forcefully, insist that a few young men into attending a birthday party for Geraldine in hopes that she will find one of them to be to her liking.  Instead, Geraldine resents her brothers for trying to force a boyfriend on her.  When party guest Lisa Jane Dennis plays the previously private message for everyone to hear, Geraldine is embarrassed; and town baker Willy Briggs, who secretly loves her, feels sorry for her having had to endure the embarrassment.  Geraldine decides to jump on a train out of town, where she meets Casper Millhouse, who sympathizes with her troubles.

Casper suggest that Geraldine show the people of Cooperville that she is capable of finding a man all on her own.  Casper introduces her to a Lonely Hearts club founder Amos Hartwell, the person and club that helped him find his fiancé, Belle Walker.  Geraldine meets with Amos, suggests a dance party, and soon becomes an organizer for more "meet-and-greet" social gatherings.  Her management abilities soon lead to radio show "Cupid Speaking" where Amos becomes a national sensation.  When Gerry becomes depressed at not finding her own romantic partner, Amos suggests that she come on the radio show as the mysterious "Madame L'Amour", who gives advise as a worldly romance specialist.  When Casper is beset with Belle eloping with con-artist, Geraldine promises to help him, and begins to search for Belle.    Madame L'Amour, responds to a letter from Willy, who then deduces that it's actually his missing love Geraldine.  Willy sets out to find her in the big city, and capture the heart of Geraldine, who has now become attracted to a supposedly wealthy J. Edmund Roberts.

Willy attends one of the club dances, and kisses a blindfolded Geraldine, who faints our of excitement.  Then Roberts claims to be the one who planted the kiss, and agrees to marry him.  After Geraldine and Roberts return to Cooperville, and she reunites with her brothers, they are pleased that their sister has finally found a man.  Then the reunited couple of Casper and Belle discover that Geraldine is being hoodwinked by the same man that swindled Belle.  Amos also discovers that Roberts also conned other women, and calls Willy, who then rushes to stall the Geraldine's wedding.  When the truth comes out Roberts is arrested for bigamy; then Willy and Geraldine kiss, and she realizes that Willy is the only man for her.  When her beloved fire truck is called into action by a fire alarm, Geraldine no longer cares, and is satisfied to be in Willy's arms.

Cast  
 Jane Withers as Geraldine Cooper
 Jimmy Lydon as Willy Briggs
 Raymond Walburn as Amos Hartwell
 Donald Meek as Casper Millhouse
 Charles Quigley as J. Edmund Roberts
 Grant Withers as Henry Cooper
 William Haade as Wayne Cooper
 Archie Twitchell as Charlie March
 Johnny Sands as Danny
 David Holt as Percy McBride
 Tanis Chandler as Liza Jane Dennis
 Harry Cheshire as Judge Fricke
 Josephine Whittell as Belle Walker
 Donia Bussey as Mrs. Bessie Hutchinson
 Edith M. Griffith as Mrs. Eddington
 George M. Carleton as Lawyer Darnell

References

External links 
 

1946 films
American comedy films
1946 comedy films
Republic Pictures films
Films directed by George Blair
American black-and-white films
1940s English-language films
1940s American films